The 2003 ATP Tour was the global elite men's professional tennis circuit organised by the Association of Tennis Professionals (ATP) for the 2003 tennis season. The ATP Tour is the elite tour for professional tennis organised by the ATP. The ATP Tour includes the four Grand Slam tournaments, the Tennis Masters Cup, the ATP Masters Series, the International Series Gold and the International Series tournaments.

Schedule 
The table below shows the 2003 ATP Tour schedule.

Key

January

February

March

April

May

June

July

August

September

October

November

Statistical information 
List of players and titles won (Grand Slam and Masters Cup titles in bold), listed in order of the number of titles won:
  Roger Federer – Marseille, Dubai, Munich, Halle, Wimbledon , Vienna and Masters Cup (7)
  Andy Roddick – St. Poelten, London Queen's Club, Indianapolis, Canada Masters, Cincinnati Masters and US Open (6)
  Guillermo Coria – Hamburg Masters, Stuttgart, Kitzbühel, Sopot and Basel (5)
  Andre Agassi – Australian Open, San Jose, Miami Masters and Houston (4)
  Juan Carlos Ferrero – Monte Carlos Masters, Valencia, French Open and Madrid Masters (4)
  Taylor Dent – Memphis, Bangkok and Moscow (3)
  Carlos Moyà – Buenos Aires, Barcelona and Umag (3)
  Nikolay Davydenko – Adelaide and Estoril (2)
  Tim Henman – Washington, D.C., and Paris Masters (2)
  Lleyton Hewitt – Scottsdale and Indian Wells Masters (2)
  Gustavo Kuerten – Auckland and St. Petersburg (2)
  Nicolás Massú – Amersfoort and Palermo (2)
  David Sánchez – Viña del Mar and Bucharest (2)
  Sjeng Schalken – 's-Hertogenbosch and Costa do Sauipe (2)
  Rainer Schüttler – Tokyo and Lyon (2)
  Paradorn Srichaphan – Chennai and Long Island (2)
  Julien Boutter – Casablanca (1)
  Agustín Calleri – Acapulco (1)
  Arnaud Clément – Metz (1)
  Wayne Ferreira – Los Angeles (1)
  Mardy Fish – Stockholm (1)
  Jan-Michael Gambill – Delray Beach (1)
  Robby Ginepri – Newport (1)
  Stefan Koubek – Doha (1)
  Karol Kučera – Copenhagen (1)
  Hyung-Taik Lee – Sydney (1)
  Félix Mantilla – Rome Masters (1)
  Max Mirnyi – Rotterdam (1)
  Jiří Novák – Gstaad (1)
  Mark Philippoussis – Shanghai (1)
  Greg Rusedski – Nottingham (1)
  Martin Verkerk – Milan (1)
  Mariano Zabaleta – Båstad (1)

The following players won their first title:
  Julien Boutter – Casablanca
  Agustín Calleri – Acapulco
  Nikolay Davydenko – Adelaide
  Mardy Fish – Stockholm
  Robby Ginepri – Newport
  Hyung-Taik Lee – Sydney
  Max Mirnyi – Rotterdam
  David Sánchez – Viña del Mar
  Martin Verkerk – Milan

Titles won by nation:
  16 (Australian Open, San Jose, Memphis, Delray Beach, Miami Masters, Houston, St. Poelten, London Queen's Club, Newport, Indianapolis, Canada Masters, Cincinnati Masters, US Open, Bangkok, Moscow and Stockholm)
  Spain 10 (Viña del Mar, Buenos Aires, Monte Carlos Masters, Barcelona, Valencia, Rome Masters, French Open, Umag, Bucharest and Madrid Masters)
  Argentina 7 (Acapulco, Hamburg Masters, Båstad, Stuttgart, Kitzbühel, Sopot and Basel)
  Switzerland 7 (Marseille, Dubai, Munich, Halle, Wimbledon , Vienna and Masters Cup)
  Australia 3 (Scottsdale, Indian Wells Masters and Shanghai)
  Netherlands 3 (Milan, 's-Hertogenbosch and Costa do Sauipe)
  United Kingdom 3 (Nottingham; Washington, D.C., and Paris Masters)
  Brazil 2 (Auckland and St. Petersburg)
  Chile 2 (Amersfoort and Palermo)
  France 2 (Casablanca and Metz)
  Germany 2 (Tokyo and Lyon)
  Russia 2 (Adelaide and Estoril)
  Thailand 2 (Chennai and Long Island)
  Austria 1 (Doha)
  Belarus 1 (Rotterdam)
  Czech Republic 1 (Gstaad)
  Slovakia 1 (Copenhagen)
  South Africa 1 (Los Angeles)
  South Korea 1 (Sydney)

ATP entry rankings

Singles 
ATP rankings

Retirements 
Following is a list of notable players (winners of a main tour title, and/or part of the ATP rankings top 100 (singles) or top 50 (doubles) for at least one week) who announced their retirement from professional tennis, became inactive (after not playing for more than 52 weeks), or were permanently banned from playing, during the 2003 season:

  Michael Chang (born February 22, 1972, in Hoboken, New Jersey) He turned professional in 1988 and reached a career-high ranking of world no. 2. He won the French Open in 1989 and was a finalist at the Australian Open and the US Open, as well as the year-end finals. In all, he won 34 career titles. He played his final career match at the US Open against Fernando González.
  Francisco Clavet (born October 24, 1968, in Aranjuez, Spain) He turned professional in 1988 and reached his career-high ranking of no. 18 in 1992. He earned eight singles titles and played his last match in Segovia in July against Nicolas Mahut.
  Fernando Meligeni (born April 12, 1971, in Buenos Aires, Argentina) He turned professional in 1990 and reached his career-high ranking of no. 25 in 1999. He reached the semifinals of the French Open in 1999 and earned three career singles titles. In doubles, he was ranked no. 34 in 1997 and earned seven career titles.
  Andrea Gaudenzi (born 30 July 1973 in Faenza, Italy) He turned professional in 1990 and reached his career-high ranking of world no. 18 in 1995. He earned three career singles titles and two doubles titles. His last match was in San Marino in August against Federico Browne.
  Paul Haarhuis (born 19 February 1966 in Eindhoven, Netherlands) He turned professional in 1989 and reached a career-high ranking of world no. 18. He reached the quarterfinals at the US Open and earned one career singles title. In doubles, he was ranked world no. 1 in 1994 and won all four Grand Slam tournaments, the French open three times. He played his last career match at Wimbledon partnering Yevgeny Kafelnikov.
  Yevgeny Kafelnikov (born 18 February 1974 in Sochi, Soviet Union) He turned professional in 1992 and reached the world no. 1 ranking in 1999. He won two Grand Slam singles titles, the 1996 French Open and the 1999 Australian Open. He also won four Grand Slam doubles titles, and the men's singles gold medal at the Sydney Olympic Games in 2000. He also helped Russia win the Davis Cup in 2002. He is the last man to have won both the men's singles and doubles titles at the same Grand Slam tournament, the 1996 French Open. He played his last match in St. Petersburg in October against Mikhail Youzhny.
  Richard Krajicek (born 6 December 1971 in Rotterdam, Netherlands) He turned professional in 1989 and reached his career-high ranking of world no. 4 in 1999. He won Wimbledon in 1996 and was a semifinalist at the Australian and French Opens. He earned 17 career ATP titles. In doubles, he was ranked world no. 45 and won three career titles, also reaching the semifinals at the Australian Open. His last career ATP match was in 's-Hertogenbusch in June against Olivier Mutis.
  Alex O'Brien (born 7 March 1970 in Amarillo, Texas) He turned professional in 1992 and reached his career-high singles ranking of world no. 30 in 1997. He earned one career singles ATP title. In doubles, he was ranked world no. 1 in 2000 and won the US Open in 1999. He was a finalist at the Australian Open in 1996 and 1997 and a quarterfinalist at Wimbledon in 1999 and 2000. His last career match was in Torrance, California, in October partnering Kevin Kim.
  Sandon Stolle (born 13 July 1970 in Sydney, New South Wales, Australia) He turned professional in 1991 and reached a career-high singles ranking of no. 50 and doubles ranking of no. 2 in 2001. He earned 22 career titles in doubles and won the US Open in 1998, partnering Cyril Suk. He was a finalist at the US Open (1995), French Open (2000), and Wimbledon (2000), each time losing the final match to the "Woodies". His last match was at the Australian Open partnering Andrew Florent.
  Daniel Vacek (born 1 April 1971 in Prague, Czechoslovakia) He turned professional in 1990 and reached his career-high singles ranking of no. 26 in 1996. In doubles, he was ranked no. 3 in 1997 and earned 25 career titles. He won the French Open in 1996 and 1997 and the US Open in 1997. He was also a quarterfinalist at the Australian Open in 1999. He played his last match at Wimbledon partnering Jim Thomas.
  Adrian Voinea (born 6 August 1974 in Focşani, Romania) He turned professional in 1993 and reached his career-high ranking of world no. 36 in 1996. He reached the quarterfinals at the French Open in 1995 and earned one career ATP title. He played his last match in Sopot in July against Olivier Mutis.

See also 
 2003 WTA Tour

References

External links 
 Association of Tennis Professionals (ATP) 2003 Results Archive
 Early-Year ATP rankings
 Year-End ATP rankings
 Davis Cup 2003 Drawsheet

 
ATP Tour
ATP Tour seasons